Cichla intermedia, the royal peacock bass, is a large species of cichlid found in the Orinoco River basin in Venezuela and Colombia.

Description
It is easily identified from other species of peacock bass, as it is the only that present a series of 8 to 9 spots running through their lateral line.

Habitat
Royal peacock bass inhabit both clear- and blackwater rivers from the Orinoco River basin.

Behavior
These fish are predatory and feed mostly on smaller fish.

References

Cichlid fish of South America
Freshwater fish of Colombia
Fish of Venezuela
Fish described in 1971
intermedia